Antusheva Gora is a rural locality (a village) in Moseyevskoye Rural Settlement, Totemsky District, Vologda Oblast, Russia. The population was 9 as of 2002.

Geography 
Antusheva Gora is located 79 km northwest of Totma (the district's administrative centre) by road. Petrishcheva Gora is the nearest rural locality.

References 

Rural localities in Tarnogsky District